Pygmaepterys is a genus of sea snails, marine gastropod mollusks in the subfamily Muricopsinae of the family Muricidae, the murex snails or rock snails.

Species

 Pygmaepterys adenensis (Houart & Wranik, 1989)
 Pygmaepterys alfredensis (Bartsch, 1915)
 Pygmaepterys aliceae (Petuch, 1987)
 † Pygmaepterys aturensis Lozouet, 1999 
 Pygmaepterys avatea Houart & Tröndlé, 2008
 Pygmaepterys bellini (D'Attilio & Myers, 1985)
 Pygmaepterys cienaguero Espinosa & Ortea, 2018
 Pygmaepterys circinatus (Houart & Héros, 2012)
 Pygmaepterys cracentis (Houart, 1996)
 Pygmaepterys dhofarensis (Houart, Gori & Rosado, 2015)
 Pygmaepterys dondani (Kosuge, 1984)
 † Pygmaepterys exoletus Lozouet, 1999 
 Pygmaepterys fournierae (Houart & Héros, 2013)
 Pygmaepterys funafutiensis (Hedley, 1899)
 Pygmaepterys germainae (Vokes & D'Attilio, 1980)
 Pygmaepterys habanensis Espinosa & Ortea, 2016
 Pygmaepterys isabelae Houart & Rosado, 2008
 Pygmaepterys juanitae (Gibson-Smith & Gibson-Smith, 1983)
 Pygmaepterys karukerensis Garrigues & Merle, 2014
 Pygmaepterys kernoi (Houart & Severns, 2013)
 Pygmaepterys kurodai Nakamigawa & Habe, 1964 
 Pygmaepterys lifouensis (Houart & Héros, 2012)
 Pygmaepterys lourdesae (Gibson-Smith & Gibson-Smith, 1983)
 Pygmaepterys maestratii Garrigues & Lamy, 2019
 Pygmaepterys maraisi (Vokes, 1978)
 Pygmaepterys menoui (Houart, 1990)
 Pygmaepterys oxossi (Petuch, 1979)
 Pygmaepterys paulboschi Smythe & Houart, 1984
 Pygmaepterys philcloveri (Houart, 1984)
 Pygmaepterys pointieri Garrigues & Merle, 2014
 Pygmaepterys poormani Radwin & D'Attilio, 1976
 Pygmaepterys puillandrei Garrigues & Lamy, 2018
 Pygmaepterys rauli (Espinosa, 1990)
 Pygmaepterys richardbinghami (Petuch, 1987)
 Pygmaepterys tacoensis Espinosa & Ortea, 2016
 Pygmaepterys yemayaensis Espinosa & Ortea, 2016
 Pygmaepterys yemenensis (Houart & Wranik, 1989)

References

 Vokes E.H. (1978). Muricidae (Mollusca: Gastropoda) from the eastern coast of Africa. Annals of the Natal Museum. 23(2): 375-418, pls 1-8.

 
Muricopsinae